DnaJ homolog subfamily A member 2 is a protein that in humans is encoded by the DNAJA2 gene.

The protein encoded by this gene shares sequence similarity with Hir1p and Hir2p, the two corepressors of histone gene transcription characterized in the yeast, Saccharomyces cerevisiae. The structural features of this protein suggest that it may function as part of a multiprotein complex. Several cDNAs encoding interacting proteins, HIRIPs, have been identified. HIRIP4 was isolated by virtue of its interaction with this protein; however, its exact function is not known. The sequence of HIRIP4 protein is highly homologous to the human DNJ3/CPR3, mouse Dj3 and rat Dj2 gene products.

References

Further reading

External links
 
 

Heat shock proteins